Silent Knight is the third studio album by the Canadian progressive rock band Saga and was originally released in August 1980. Silent Knight is certified Gold in Canada (50 000), having reached No. 42 in the charts. The Einstein Tower in Potsdam, Germany was used as a template for the album cover. Silent Knight marks the debut appearance of longtime keyboardist Jim Gilmour.

The Chapters
Two of the songs, "Don't Be Late (Chapter Two)" and "Too Much to Lose (Chapter Seven)" were part of a series of eight (but later sixteen) songs that Saga included within their first four albums called "The Chapters", which told the story of a young Albert Einstein. These songs were later included on The Chapters Live (2005). To date, there's been no official compilation of the chapters in their studio incarnation.

Track listing 
All credits adapted from the original release.

Personnel
Saga
 Michael Sadler – lead vocals, keyboards, bass guitar
 Ian Crichton – electric and acoustic guitars
 Jim Gilmour – keyboards, Moog synthesizers, vocoder, backing vocals
 Jim Crichton – bass guitar, synth bass, Moog Taurus bass synthesizer
 Steve Negus – drums, percussion

Production
 Paul Gross – producer
 Alan Thorne – engineer
 Mick Walsh – engineer 
 Jeff Stobbs, Lenny Derose, Robin Brouwers – re-mixing assistant engineer
 Mark Wright – re-mixing engineer

References

External links 
 Saga - Silent Knight (1980) album to be listened on Spotify
 

1980 albums
Saga (band) albums
Polydor Records albums